A chess set consists of a chessboard and white and black chess pieces for playing chess. There are sixteen pieces of each color: one king, one queen, two rooks, two bishops, two knights, and eight pawns. Extra pieces may be provided for use in promotion, most commonly one extra queen per color. Chess boxes, chess clocks, and chess tables are common pieces of chess equipment used alongside chess sets. Chess sets are made in a wide variety of styles, sometimes for ornamental rather than practical purposes. For tournament play, the Staunton chess set is preferred and, in some cases, required.

Human chess uses people as the pieces. Blindfold chess may be played without any set at all.

Middle Ages sets
The oldest chess sets adopted abstract shapes following the Muslim traditional sets of the shatranj game. These pieces evolved with time, as more details were added, to a figurative design.

In the abstract designs, both the king and the queen resemble a throne, with the queen being smaller; the bishop displays two small protuberances, representing elephant tusks; the knight presents a single protuberance, representing the head of a horse; the rook has a V-shaped cut on the top; and the pawn usually has a simple shape.

Notable archaeological chess sets include the following:

 The San Genadio chess pieces, a 9th-century set of two rooks, a knight and a bishop, in abstract form. The pieces, made of Deer antler, were found in Peñalba de Santiago, in Astorga (Spain). In olden times mistaken by relics of San Genadio (hence the name), they are probably the oldest European chess pieces.
 The Charlemagne chessmen, an 11th-century set probably manufactured in Salerno, Italy. The set, carved from elephant ivory, was originally inventoried with a total of 30 pieces, but today only 16 are preserved in Saint Denis : 2 Kings, 2 Queens, 4 Knights, 4 Elephants, 3 Chariots and a Foot Soldier.
 The Lewis chessmen, a collection of 79 assorted 12th-century chess pieces and other game pieces – mostly carved from walrus ivory. Discovered in 1831 on Lewis in the Outer Hebrides of Scotland.

 The Clonard chess piece, an historic playing piece depicting a queen seated on a throne, dated from the late 12th-century. It was found in a bog in  Clonard, Co. Meath, Ireland, some time before 1817.

Table sets 
The variety of designs available is broad, from small cosmetic changes to highly abstract representations, to themed designs such as those that emulate the drawings from the works of Lewis Carroll, or modern treatments such as Star Trek or The Simpsons. Themed designs are generally intended for display purposes rather than actual play. Some works of art are designs of chess sets, such as the modernist chess set by chess enthusiast and dadaist Man Ray, that is on display in the Museum of Modern Art in New York City.

Chess pieces used for play are usually figurines that are taller than they are wide. Chess sets are available in a variety of designs, the most known being the Staunton design, named after Howard Staunton, a 19th-century English chess player, and designed by Nathaniel Cooke. The first Staunton style sets were made in 1849 by Jaques of London (also known as John Jaques of London and Jaques and Son of London)

Wooden white chess pieces are normally made of a light wood, boxwood, or sometimes maple. Black wooden pieces are made of a dark wood such as rosewood, ebony, red sandalwood, African Padauk wood (African padauk which is similar to red sandalwood and is marketed as Bud Rosewood or Blood Red Rosewood) or walnut. Sometimes they are made of boxwood and stained or painted black, brown, or red.  The knights in wooden sets are usually hand-carved, accounting for half the cost of the set.  Plastic white pieces are made of white or off-white plastic, and plastic black pieces are made of black or red plastic. Sometimes other materials are used, such as bone, ivory, or a composite material.

For actual play, pieces of the Staunton chess set design are standard. The diameter of the king should be 40–50% of its height. The size of the other pieces should be in proportion to the king. The pieces should be well balanced such that their center of gravity is closer to the board. This is done by adding weights such as iron studs or lead blocks at the bottom and felted. It makes the pieces bottom-heavy and keeps them from toppling easily (a well-weighted piece should come upright even if tilted 60 degrees off vertical axis). This helps in blitz games as the speed of movement doesn't offer enough time or precision in dropping the pieces onto the intended squares. These criteria are from the United States Chess Federation's Official Rules of Chess, which is based on the Fédération Internationale des Échecs rules.

The grandmaster Larry Evans offered this advice on buying a set:Make sure the one you buy is easy on the eye, felt-based, and heavy (weighted). The men should be constructed so they don't come apart. ... The regulation board used by the U. S. Chess Federation is green and buff—never red and black. However, there are several good inlaid wood boards on the market. ... Avoid cheap equipment. Chess offers a lifetime of enjoyment for just a few dollars well spent at the outset.

Pocket and travel sets 
Some small magnetic sets, designed to be compact and/or for travel, have pieces more like those used in shogi and xiangqi – each piece being a similar flat token, with a symbol printed on it to identify the piece type.

Chess boxes 
A container for holding chess pieces is known as a chess box.  Most commonly made of wood, a chess box can be constructed of any material.  The internal box configuration can be individual slots for each chess piece, one divider to separate the white and black pieces or no divider with the chess pieces mixed together.  The chess box is typically rectangular but can be done in a variety a shapes including a coffer top or sliding drawers.

Computer images 
On computers, chess pieces are often 2D symbols on a 2D board, although some programs have 3D graphics engines with more traditional designs of chess pieces.

Unicode contains symbols for chess pieces in both white and black.

Gallery

See also

 Chess equipment
 Dubrovnik chess set
 Gökyay Association Chess Museum

References

Works cited